Antoine Jean Marie Thévenard (7 December 1733, in Saint-Malo – 9 February 1815, in Paris) was a French politician and vice admiral. He served in the French ruling regimes of Louis XVI, those of the Revolution, Napoleon I and Louis XVIII, and is buried at the Panthéon de Paris. His son Antoine-René Thévenard, capitaine de vaisseau, was killed at the Battle of Aboukir whilst commanding the 74-gun Aquilon.

Career
Thévenard was born to Antoine Thévenard, a senior officer in the merchant navy, and Jeanne Moinet. He began sailing as a lieutenant in 1747 on merchantmen captained by his father, and went on to sail for the Compagnie des Indes.

Aged 12 he embarked on a Compagnie des Indes ship and fought in several battles.  He became a lieutenant in 1754 and destroyed the English establishments on the Newfoundland coast and took part in the pirate François Thurot's expedition to Ireland (1759). He earned the rank of Capitaine de vaisseau in the Compagnie des Indes in 1764, and earned his first command of an East Indianer in 1768.

Thévenard enlisted in the French Royal Navy in 1770, where his rank in the Compagnie des Indes earned him the rank of Commander. He was appointed Knight of the Order of Saint Louis and rose to captain in 1773, commanded the Lorient fleet from 1779, was promoted to Brigadeer of the naval armies in 1784, and eventually to Chef d'escadre in 1783.

In May 1791, Thévenard replaced Fleurieu as ministre de la Marine under Louis XVI, but resigned in September 1791, fallen out of favour because of his political opinions against the French Revolution.

Promoted Vice-amiral in 1793, he commanded the fleets at Brest, then Toulon, then Rochefort, and became Préfet maritime of Lorient then Toulon in 1801, where he remained until 1815.

In October 1799, Thévenard presided at the court-martial of Rear-Admiral Perrée, to examine the events of the action of 18 June 1799, in which he had lost his ships. He similarly presided at the court-martial following the capture of the Guillaume Tell in 1800, and the enquiry on the conduct of Rear-Admiral Dumanoir le Pelley at the Battle of Trafalgar. In 1809, he investigated the capitulation of Flessingen.

On 5 February 1810 he was made a comte d'Empire and member of the Sénat conservateur. In this capacity, he voted for the dismissal of Napoléon in 1814, which earned him an appointment to the Chambre des Pairs by Louis XVIII after the Bourbon Restoration in 1814. On 27 December 1814, he was promoted Commandeur in the Order of Saint-Louis.

Thévenard died on 9 February 1815 and was interred in the Panthéon in Paris.

Memberships
1771 : Member of the Académie de Marine
1787 : Member of the Académie des Sciences

Honours
 1773 : Knight of the Ordre de Saint-Louis. He was promoted to Commander on 27 December 1814, under the Bourbon Restoration.
 1804 : Grand officer of the Légion d'honneur
 buried in the Panthéon

Works 
 By Antoine-Jean-Marie Thévenard
 Rapports à l'Académie de Marine
 Services militaires des officiers de l'ancienne Compagnie des Indes
 Sur une École de marine à Lorient
 Sur le Commerce des Indes-Orientales
 Calculs pour tirer un vaisseau à terre
 Comparaison des courbes de fer à celles de bois
 Observations sur l'ordonnance de la marine du 27 Septembre 1776
 Projet de guerre contre les Anglais
 Mesurer avec précision la profondeur de la mer en sondant
 Nouvelle édition du Neptune oriental
 Sur l'établissement d'un port de secours à Pontrieux
 Expérience sur l'air dans les vaisseaux désarmés
 Essai sur les phares
 Observations météorologiques
 Sur le doublage en cuivre des vaisseaux, les toiles à voiles, la circulation du sang, la pêche à la sardine, la conservation des gens de mer, le commerce entre la France et les États-Unis
 Sur l'Île de la Trinité
 Sur l'enduit nommé galgale
 Sur le magnétisme animal
 Sur les Volcans, l'Artillerie, la Mécanique, la Lumière, le Nivellement de la Mer Rouge, la Résistance des Fluides, le Passage du raz de Sein ou de Fontenay

All the above were later re-printed in four volumes as Mémoires relatifs à la marine.

Notes and references

Notes

References

Bibliography 
  (San-Thou)
 

External links
 
 

1733 births
1815 deaths
Politicians from Saint-Malo
Ministers of Marine and the Colonies
French Navy admirals
Burials at the Panthéon, Paris
Counts of the First French Empire
Members of the Sénat conservateur
Grand Officiers of the Légion d'honneur
Commanders of the Order of Saint Louis
French naval commanders of the Napoleonic Wars
Peers of France
French Navy officers from Saint-Malo